Pachystropheus (After Greek Pachys, "Thick" and Strophaios, Vertebrae) is a genus of prehistoric reptile, possibly a choristodere (champsosaur), from the Rhaetian (Late Triassic) of southwestern England.  It was named by Erika von Huene in 1935; Huene described Pachystropheus as a champsosaur, but this was overlooked for decades until its redescription by Storrs and Gower in 1993.  This reevaluation would extend the fossil record of champsosaurs back 45 million years. However, other authors consider attribution of Pachystropheus to Choristodera problematic, stating that it depends on vertebral and girdle characters that are also found in the skeletons of aquatic reptiles other than choristoderes; most of the diagnostic features of choristoderes are skull features, but the presence of these cannot be confirmed in Pachystropheus, as there is no confirmed skull material for this taxon. Silvio Renesto (2005) found similarities in the postcranial skeleton of Pachystropheus and the thalattosaur genus Endennasaurus; according to Renesto, these similarities may indicate that Pachystropheus and Endennasaurus are close relatives, but they might as well simply be a case of a convergent evolution triggered by the aquatic lifestyle of both taxa.

References

Choristodera
Triassic diapsids
Late Triassic reptiles of Europe
Prehistoric marine reptiles
Prehistoric reptile genera